Fremont Township is the name of some places in the U.S. state of Michigan:

 Fremont Township, Isabella County, Michigan
 Fremont Township, Saginaw County, Michigan
 Fremont Township, Sanilac County, Michigan
 Fremont Township, Tuscola County, Michigan

See also
 Fremont, Michigan, city in Newaygo County

Michigan township disambiguation pages